Dawes is a surname. Notable people with the surname include:

Albert Dawes (1907–1973), English association footballer
Andrew Dawes (1940–2022), Canadian violinist
Belle Dawes (born 2001), Australian rules footballer
Beman Gates Dawes (1870–1953), politician and oil executive who served two terms as a Republican Congressman from Ohio
Charles G. Dawes (1865–1951), banker, politician and 30th Vice President of the United States
Christie Dawes (born 1980), Australian wheelchair racer
Christopher Dawes (disambiguation), multiple people
David Dawes (born 1964), one of the founders of the XFree86 project
Dominique Dawes (born 1976), United States gymnast
Edward Dawes (1805–1856), British Liberal Member of Parliament (MP) for the Isle of Wight 1851–1852
Eva Dawes (1912–2009), Canadian track and field athlete
Fred Dawes (1911–1989), English association footballer
Henry L. Dawes (1816–1903), United States Senator  of Massachusetts, who sponsored the Dawes Act
Henry May Dawes (1877–1952), American businessman and banker from a prominent Ohio family
Ian Dawes (born 1963), former professional footballer
James W. Dawes (1844–1918),  Republican Nebraska politician best known as the sixth governor of Nebraska
John Dawes (1940–2021), Welsh rugby union player
Johnny Dawes (born 1964), British rock climber
Julian Dawes (born 1942), English composer
Karl Friedrich Griffin Dawes (1861–1941), Norwegian politician for the Liberal Party
Kwame Dawes (born 1962), poet, actor, editor, critic, musician and professor of English at the University of South Carolina in Columbia
Marylou Dawes (1933–2013), Canadian pianist
Melanie Dawes (born 1966), British economist and civil servant
Neville Dawes (1926–1984), novelist and poet born in Nigeria of Jamaican parentage
Nigel Dawes (born 1985), Canadian ice hockey left winger
Richard Dawes (disambiguation)
Rufus Dawes (1838–1899), U.S. military officer in the American Civil War
Rufus C. Dawes (1867–1940), American businessman from a prominent Ohio family
Sophie Dawes, Baronne de Feuchères ( – 1840), English-born adventuress best known as a mistress of Louis Henry II, Prince of Condé
Thomas Dawes (1731–1809), American soldier, colonel in the American Revolution
William Dawes (1745–1799), American activist in the American Revolution
William Dawes (bishop) (1671–1724), 3rd Baronet Dawes, bishop of Chester from 1708 to 1714
William Dawes (British Marines officer) (1762–1836), Australian pioneer and scientist
William Rutter Dawes (1799–1868), British astronomer
Zach Dawes (born 1985), American musician

Fictional characters 
George Dawes, a character from Shooting Stars portrayed by Matt Lucas
Marjorie Dawes, a character from Little Britain portrayed by Matt Lucas
Nancy Dawes, a character in the novel series The Baby-sitters Club and Baby-sitters Little Sister
Rachel Dawes, a character in the film Batman Begins

See also 
 Daws (name), given name and nickname
 Dawe (surname)

Patronymic surnames
Surnames from given names